A bathtub Madonna (also known as a lawn shrine, Mary on the half shell, bathtub Mary, bathtub Virgin, and bathtub shrine) is an artificial grotto typically framing a Roman Catholic religious figure.

Variations
These shrines most often house a statue of the Blessed Virgin Mary but sometimes hold the image of another Catholic saint or of Jesus.  Infrequently, more than one figure is represented.

While often constructed by upending an old bathtub and burying one end, similar designs have been factory produced.  These factory produced enclosures sometimes have decorative features that their recycled counterparts lack, such as fluting reminiscent of a scallop shell.

The grotto is sometimes embellished with brickwork or stonework, and framed with flowerbeds or other ornamental flora.  The inside of the tub is frequently painted a light blue color, particularly if the statue is of Mary because of her association with this color.  Over time, distinguishing characteristics of these shrines can become blurred. Instances occur of shrines whose statue is missing and conversely of grottoes being removed, leaving a statue in place.

Locations

Bathtub Marys in actual bathtubs are frequently found in the Upper Mississippi River valley, but was invented by Azorean Portuguese of New Bedford, Massachusetts, and Fall River, Massachusetts, but is also found in western Wisconsin, eastern Iowa and Minnesota, and are an important part of the visual folk culture of Roman Catholics in that region. Noteworthy concentrations of bathtub Madonnas can be found in Stearns County, Minnesota, an area heavily settled by German-American Catholics in the mid-19th century, the Holyland in eastern Wisconsin, and rural Bay City, Michigan.

Bathtub Madonnas are also a common sight in north-central Kentucky and southern Indiana, an area that has historically been predominantly Catholic. A drive down country roads in Nelson, Marion, and Washington counties will provide ample sightings of these small shrines.

In the Southern United States, bathtub Marys are a regular sight in the Cajun portion of South Louisiana, especially along the Bayou Teche. Breaux Bridge, St. Martinville, Port Barre, Cecilia, Baldwin and other communities along the bayou have examples of this type of shrine.  They are also commonly found in the Baltimore, Maryland metropolitan area, and this prevalence was lampooned in the John Waters film Pecker.

Google and magazine database searches reveal instances of bathtub shrines among other Catholic ethnic groups in other locations, e.g., Mexican Americans in Milwaukee, Italian Americans in Michigan, and Hispanic Americans in New Mexico, French Catholics in Quebec, and in the heavily Polish-Italian-Irish Catholic region of northeastern Pennsylvania, particularly around Scranton.

In the northeastern United States, smaller shrines that do not make use of actual bathtubs are more common. Somerville, Massachusetts, a city which has traditionally had sizable Italian, Irish, Portuguese and (more recently) Brazilian populations, has over 350 Catholic yard shrines in a town of about four square miles, with more than 40 in actual bathtubs.

See also
Roadside memorial
Wayside shrine
Nicho
Saint Iconography

Notes

Further reading
"For the Love of Mary—Yard Shrines Honoring Blessed Virgin Have Devoted Following", St. Cloud Visitor (Newspaper of the Roman Catholic Diocese of St. Cloud, Minnesota), August 16, 2001.

External links

A Creole yard shrine in Louisiana
Front Yard Shrines and Wayside Shrines
The Grotto of Unyang Pusan, South Korea

Sacramentals
Garden ornaments
Architectural elements
Wisconsin culture
Minnesota folklore
German-American culture
Marian devotions